Members of the Left Front Ministry in the Indian state of West Bengal as in May 2006 were as follows:

Cabinet ministers
 Buddhadeb Bhattacharjee - Chief minister, Home, Home (P & R), Information & Cultural Affairs, Science & Technology, Minorities development, Darjeeling, Food processing, Horticulture, Development & Planning
 Nirupam Sen - Commerce & Industries, Public Undertakings, Industrial Reconstruction
 Dr Surjya Kanta Mishra - Health & Family Welfare, Panchayats & Rural Development, Bio-technology, ESI
 Gautam Deb - Housing, Public Health Engineering
 Dr Asim Dasgupta - Finance, Excise
 Subhas Chakraborty - Transport, Youth Services, Sports
 Naren De - Agriculture, Consumer Affairs
 Kshiti Goswami – PWD
 Nandagopal Bhattacharjee - Minor Irrigation, Water Investigation & Development
 Kiranmoy Nanda - Fisheries, Aqua-culture, Harbours
 Pratim Chatterjee - Fire services, Emergency Services
 Partha De - School Education Department
 Manab Mukherjee - Cottage & Small Scale, Tourism
 Rekha Goswami - Self-help Group, Self-employment
 Ashok Bhattacharya - Municipal Affairs, Urban Development, North Bengal Development and Hill affairs, Town & Country planning
 Abdur Razzak Molla - Land & Land Reforms
 Sailen Sarkar - Parliamentary Affairs
 Mrinal Banerjee - Power, labour
 Biswanath Chowdhury - Jail, Child & Women Development, Social Welfare
 Rabindra Ghosh - Co-operation
 Jogesh Barman - Backward Classes Welfare
 Anisur Rahaman - Animal Resources Development
 Dr Debesh Das - Information Technology
 Prof. Sudarshan Roy Choudhury - Higher Education
 Ananta Roy Barman – Forests
 Paresh Chandra Adhikari - Food and Supplies Department
 Robilal Moitra - Judicial and Law Department
 Chakradhar Meikap - Technical Education
 Subhas Naskar - Irrigation, Waterways
 Kanti Ganguly - Sunderbans Development Affairs
 Susanta Ghosh - Paschimanchal Unnayan Affairs
 Mohanta Chatterjee – Environment
 Dr Mortoza Hossein - Relief, Agricultural Marketing

Ministers of State

 Deblina Hembram - MOS Backward Classes Welfare
 Manohar Tirkey - MOS PWD
 Srikumar Mukherjee - MOS Home, Civil Defence
 Bilashibala Sahis - MOS Forests
 Narayan Biswas - MOS Cottage & Small Scale Industries
 Abdus Sattar - MOS Minorities Development, Welfare, Madrasah 
 Bankim Chandra Ghosh - MOS Panchayat & Rural Development
 Anwarul Haque - MOS Public Health engineering
 Binay Krishna Biswas - MOS Refugee relief & Rehabilitation
 Tapan Roy - MOS Mass Education Extension, Library
 Anadi Kumar Sahu - MOS Labour

Notes

References

West Bengal ministries
2006 in Indian politics
Communist Party of India (Marxist) state ministries
2006 establishments in West Bengal
2011 disestablishments in India
Cabinets established in 2006
Cabinets disestablished in 2011